The 2006 GFI Hong Kong Tens was played on Wednesday 29 March and Thursday 30 March 2006, with New Zealand Metro winning the Cup. The Plate was won by PWC Panthers, a team from Australia, while the Bowl was picked up by SCB Asian Cavaliers, a team with members from all round the World. Acorns Rugby Club, from Japan, picked up the Shield. 

The SCB Asian Cavaliers were coached by James Clark (Australian living in Hong Kong) ) and James Cook (New Zealander) also living in Hong Kong. The two expat coaches' first game was against a team full of ex All Blacks including the one and only Jonah Lomu. It was one his last tournaments before his passing in 2015 from Myocardial infarction. 

The 2 days of rugby provide the lead up to the Hong Kong 7's tournament and is regarded as the best 10's tournament in the world.  

Tens rugby is a variation on rugby union and rugby sevens, with teams having 10 players: 5 forwards and 5 backs. 10 minute halves are played.

The 2006 Tournament was played at Hong Kong Football Club, Happy Valley, Hong Kong.

Results

Wednesday
Aliens 57 - 0 Acorns Rugby Club
Irish Vikings 36 - 5 Alvarez & Marshal DeA Tigers
New Zealand Metro 54 - 0 Standard Chartered Bank Asian Cavaliers
Sumitomo Tamariva 17 - 5 China Agricultural University
HSBC New Zealand Legends 44-0 CBRE Club
WDA Cardiff University 22 - 0 Overseas Old Boys
PWC International Panthers 47 - 0 Laxton PLA
Hill & Associates Hong Kong Barbarians 45 - 0 Black Watch
Aliens 29 - 0 Alvarez & Marshal DeA Tigers
Irish Vikings 7 -5 Acorns Rugby Club
New Zealand Metro 78 - 0 China Agricultural University
Sumitomo Tamariva 12 - 7 Standard Chartered Bank Asian Cavaliers
HSBC New Zealand Legends 54 - 0 Overseas Old Boys
WDA Cardiff University 48 - 0 CBRE Club
PWC International Panthers 59 - 0 Black Watch
Hill & Associates Hong Kong Barbarians 31 - 0 Laxton PLA
Acorns Rugby Club 29 - 5 Alvarez & Marshal DeA Tigers
Standard Chartered Bank Asian Cavaliers 7 - 29 China Agricultural University
CBRE Club 7 - 15 Overseas Old Boys
Laxton PLA 26 - 5 Black Watch
Aliens 26 - 5 Irish Vikings
New Zealand Metro 66 - 0 Sumitomo Tamariva
HSBC New Zealand Legends 24 - 5 WDA Cardiff University
PWC International Panthers 0 - 27 Hill & Associates Hong Kong Barbarians

Thursday

Quarter-finals
Bowl Acorns 19 - 29 Asian Cavaliers
Bowl Laxton PLA 31 - 10 CBRE Club
Bowl Overseas Old Boys 17 - 12 Black Watch
Bowl CAU 5 - 7 DeA Tigers
Cup Aliens 41 - 7 Tamariva
Cup HK Barbarians 21 - 0 Cardiff University
Cup NZ Legends 33 - 7 International Panthers
Cup NZ Metro 42 - 7 Irish Vikings

Semi-finals
Shield Acorns 62 - 0 CBRE Club
Shield Black Watch 14 - 33 CAU
Bowl Asian Cavaliers 26 - 19 Laxton PLA
Bowl Overseas Old Boys 5 - 21 DeA Tigers
Plate Tamariva 5 - 24 Cardiff University
PlateInternational Panthers 12 - 7 Irish Vikings
Cup Aliens 7 - 0 HK Barbarians
Cup NZ Legends 3 - 12 NZ Metro

Finals
Shield Acorns 17 - 7 CAU
Bowl Asian Cavaliers 21 - 7 DeA Tigers
Plate Cardiff University 12 - 21 International Panthers
Cup Aliens 14 - 17 NZ Metro

External links
2006 GFI Hong Kong Tens Official Site

2006 in Asian rugby union
2006 rugby union tournaments for clubs
2006 in Hong Kong sport
International rugby union competitions hosted by Hong Kong